Hanzakoma  or Hamzakoma is a rural commune of the Cercle of Gourma-Rharous in the Tombouctou Region of Mali. The commune contains 19 villages and in the 2009 census had a population of 7,929. The principal village (chef-lieu) is Minkiri.

References

External links
.
.

Communes of Tombouctou Region